The 2000–01 Romanian Hockey League season was the 71st season of the Romanian Hockey League. Seven teams participated in the league, and Steaua Bucuresti won the championship.

Regular season

Playoffs

Semifinals
SC Miercurea Ciuc - Sportul Studențesc Bucharest (9-2, 13-0)
CSA Steaua Bucuresti - Progym Gheorgheni (2-4, 7-1, 3-2)

3rd place
Progym Gheorgheni - Sportul Studențesc Bucharest (12-2, 3-2, 2-3, 15-0)

Final
CSA Steaua Bucuresti - SC Miercurea Ciuc (5-2, 6-4, 4-3)

External links
Season on hockeyarchives.info

Romanian Hockey League seasons
Romanian
Rom